North Korea competed as the Democratic People's Republic of Korea at the 1998 Winter Olympics in Nagano, Japan.

Short track speed skating

Men

Women

Speed skating

Women

References
Official Olympic Reports
 Olympic Winter Games 1998, full results by sports-reference.com

Korea, North
1998
1998 in North Korean sport